is an important temple of the Shugendō religion in Yoshino district, Nara prefecture, Japan.  It is located at the peak of Mount Ōmine, or Sanjōgatake.  According to tradition, it was founded by En no Ozunu, the founder of Shugendō, a form of mountain asceticism drawing from Buddhist and Shinto beliefs. Along with Kinpusen-ji Temple, it is considered the most important temple in Shugendō.

The sanctuary around the Sanjōgatake peak has long been considered sacred in Shugendō, and women are not allowed in the area beyond four "gates" on the route to the peak. On the neighboring Inamuragatake peak, altitude 1,726 m, it has been opened as a place of training for female believers since 1959, thus called .

In 2004, Ōminesan-ji was designated as part of a UNESCO World Heritage Site under the name Sacred Sites and Pilgrimage Routes in the Kii Mountain Range.

See also
Sacred Sites and Pilgrimage Routes in the Kii Mountain Range
Shugendō

Notes and references

External links

Sacred places and pilgrimage roads in Kii mountains –Yoshino, Ōmine area 
Ōmine Okugake Training 

Buddhist temples in Nara Prefecture
World Heritage Sites in Japan
Important Cultural Properties of Japan
Historic Sites of Japan
Shugendō